Kanjeh may refer to:
Kanjeh, Ardabil
Kanjeh, Kohgiluyeh and Boyer-Ahmad